Most of Cristina D'Avena's songs are opening and closing themes of animated series aired by Mediaset (previously Fininvest) television channels. Some songs are themes of television series and television programs. In the following list they are listed by year.

Songs
Light-green background in "Title" indicates songs which are Italian adaptation of original theme.

See also
Cristina D'Avena singles discography
Cristina D'Avena albums discography
List of covers recorded by Cristina D'Avena
List of songs recorded by Cristina D'Avena

D'Avena, Cristina